The 2016 season was Reading's first season in the FA WSL 1, after winning promotion from the FA WSL 2 in 2015.

Season events
On 23 December 2015, Reading announced the signing of Amber-Keegan Stobbs from Washington Spirit.

On 28 December 2015, Reading announced their second signing prior to the 2016 FA WSL, with Kayleigh Hines signing from of Oxford United for an undisclosed fee.

On 8 January, Reading announced the signing of Jade Boho from Bristol Academy.

On 19 February, Reading announced the signing of Mary Earps from Bristol Academy.

On 30 June, Reading announced the signing of Remi Allen to a long-term contract from Birmingham City for an undisclosed fee.

On 6 July, Reading completed the signing of Sophie Perry on a free transfer after her Brighton & Hove Albion contract had expired.

At the end of the 2016 season, Shelly Cox, Amber-Keegan Stobbs, Lois Roche, Jade Boho, Laura May Walkley. Helen Ward and Nia Jones were all released by the club.

Squad

Transfers

In

Out

Loans out

Released

Competitions

Overview

Women's Super League

Results summary

Results by matchday

Results

League table

FA Cup

WSL Cup

Squad statistics

Appearances 

|-
|colspan="14"|Players away from the club on loan:

|-
|colspan="14"|Players who appeared for Reading but left during the season:
|}

Goal scorers

Clean sheets

Disciplinary record

References

Reading F.C. Women